Philip S. Cifarelli, M.D., J.D. (July 18, 1935 – April 2, 2008) was an American physician and attorney in Orange County, California who established a legal medicine bioethics educational program at the Western University of Health Sciences in Pomona, California, formerly COMP.

Early life
Dr. Cifarelli was born in his parents' New York City home on July 18, 1935.   The son of an Italian immigrant father, Dr. Cifarelli spent his youth in Jackson Heights, New York. In 1952 at 16 years of age he entered the Men's Light-Heavyweight Division of the Golden Gloves Boxing league where he earned an impressive winning record over a short boxing career in which he was never knocked down and lost only one bout.  Throughout his young adulthood Dr. Cifarelli spent time working in the Roman Bronze Works foundry, the oldest and longest running foundry in America, in Brooklyn, New York, which was owned and operated by his maternal uncle and which produced some of the most notable bronze sculptures of the 20th Century, including the Heisman Trophy, the statue of Thomas Jefferson in the Jefferson Memorial in Washington, D.C., the Iwo-Jima Memorial In Washington, D.C., the statue of Atlas at Rockefeller Center, New York and many other iconic pieces.   It was there where Dr. Cifarelli developed an interest in bronze sculpture that lasted throughout his lifetime.

Education and early medical career
Dr. Cifarelli showed very little ability or interest in academics during his schooling through high school.  Rather, he interacted with a "tough crowd" often getting into many physical confrontations all the way through high school—he barely graduated and had numerous disciplinary issues.  Consequently, the high school guidance counselor recommended Cifarelli pursue a career involving manual labor and upon graduation gave him an application to the Sanitation Department for the City of New York.  This clearly was a turning point in Cifarelli's life and was the beginning of a lifelong pursuit of education and knowledge.  Upon graduation from high school Cifarelli did not have high enough grades for general admission to college.  Instead, he was allowed to enroll in two college courses on a probationary status during the summer immediately following high school graduation.  He earned straight A's in the courses and was accepted into the University; within one year his performance earned him an academic scholarship.  Dr. Cifarelli majored in Biology at Long Island University while working nights as an attendant at the famed Metropolitan Opera House in New York City, where he developed a lifelong love of opera. His honors for academic achievement included earning a Departmental Medal in Biology which was presented to him by William Zeckendorf.  A natural linguist, Dr. Cifarelli read, wrote and spoke four languages.  He spoke two different dialects of Italian and understood and was semi-conversational in Latin.  He was so proficient in French that after his first year of studies in college he became the preferred student-substitute for French class at all levels on campus. He went on to attend medical school at Georgetown University in Washington, D.C. On a visit home during medical school he met Jean Abitabile, a New York native, whom he later married. After graduating from Georgetown, Dr. Cifarelli returned to New York City, where he practiced medicine for several years, working with well-known New York physicians including Dr. Philip A. LoPresti.  During this period Dr. Cifarelli, in collaboration with others, became involved developing and testing the gastroscope, the medical device now commonly used to screen patients for colon cancer. Dr. Cifarelli earned his reputation as one of the pioneers of the medical specialty of Gastroenterology working in many hospitals in Brooklyn and Queens, N.Y. including St. Mary's Hospital in Brooklyn, N.Y. where he founded the Gastroenterology Clinic and served as Chief of the Department.

Military service - Vietnam and the Persian Gulf War
In 1966, recognizing the dire need created by the Vietnam War for physicians in the military, Dr. Cifarelli voluntarily enlisted in the United States Army. He served in Vietnam from 1966 through 1967, attaining the rank of Captain and serving as Chief of Medicine at the 67th Evac. Hospital in QuiNan, Vietnam. He was awarded a Bronze Star and a Letter of Commendation for his service during the war.

Dr. Cifarelli's respect and admiration for military service never faded. In 1982 he re-joined the Army, in its reserve unit as a Lt. Colonel. Two years later he attained the rank of full Colonel and continued to serve in the U.S. Army Reserves Medical Corps through most of the 1990s. During that period he was named Chief of Medicine and later Commander of the 349th General Hospital in Los Angeles, a unit called to serve in the Persian Gulf War. He also commanded the 458th MASH Unit and later served as a Consultant to the U.S. Army Surgeon General, obtaining a top secret clearance at the Pentagon. As the millennium arrived Dr. Cifarelli finally retired from the military.

Move to California
In December 1970 Dr. Cifarelli moved his wife and four children to California where his medical career flourished. Through the 1970s and 1980s Dr. Cifarelli served as Chief of Medicine and Chief of Staff at several Orange County hospitals including Good Samaritan Hospital in Anaheim, California.  At Good Samaritan in 1978 Dr. Cifarelli met and befriended Ferdinand Waldo Demara  aka "the Great Imposter," who was serving as the hospital's chaplain.   Recognizing that Demara did not appear to have any family or close relationships, Dr. Cifarelli began regularly inviting Demara to family gatherings at his home.   As Chief of Staff, Dr. Cifarelli was also instrumental in helping secure for Demara a place to live in the hospital, where Demara later died.    In the 1970s Dr. Cifarelli began teaching clinical medicine at U.C. Irvine Medical School and legal medical subjects at COMP. He ultimately attained the rank of full clinical professor at UCI Medical School and at COMP and held those positions until his death. In 1979 he was named in the First Edition of "The Best Doctors of America."

Legal career
In the mid 1970s Dr. Cifarelli began attending night school at the Western State College of Law, while continuing his busy career as a physician during the day. He passed the bar and began practicing both law and medicine in 1979, becoming one of the first practicing physicians and attorneys in Orange County.   He devoted much of his practice to medical malpractice issues.  He later moved his law practice to Santa Ana and continued to practice law for several years, joined in the late 1980s by his oldest son Philip C. Cifarelli, J.D.

After a short semi-retirement in the late 1990s, Dr. Cifarelli returned to the practice of law around 2000, joining the law firm run by his sons including well-known child rights attorney Thomas A. Cifarelli, at The Cifarelli Law Firm, LLP.  It was during the second half of his legal career where Dr. Cifarelli took up the cause of representing physicians in legal/ethical issues related to the treatment of patients including the terminally ill.

Teaching and advocating for patients' rights
Dr. Cifarelli spent much of the second half of his legal and teaching career on bioethics issues on behalf of terminally ill patients seeking the right to die with dignity and the physicians who treat them.   Always driven by a love of education and philosophy, Dr. Cifarelli became actively involved with the American College of Legal Medicine, educating practicing physicians and attorneys about cutting edge issues involving Bio-Ethics and the right to death with dignity. He ascended to the rank of President of the American College of Legal Medicine in 2005 and was honored with the organization's Gold Medal for lifetime achievement in March 2008.  At COMP Dr. Cifarelli established the school's first Legal Medicine Ethics program in 1978 and taught generations of physicians about the ethical and legal issues doctors face on a daily basis in their care of patients including the terminally ill.  Dr. Cifarelli truly loved teaching and his 29 years of lecturing at COMP provided him much joy.  In his legal practice Dr. Cifarelli successfully represented many physicians being investigated by the State Medical Board for following patients' wishes and providing advanced end-of-life care to terminally ill and suffering patients.     Dr. Cifarelli also promoted awareness of these subjects through his active leadership in the American College of Legal Medicine.

Death and family
Dr. Cifarelli was diagnosed with lung cancer in the Summer of 2007.  He underwent extensive treatment for the disease until his death.  He is survived by his four children Emilia Longo, Nina Longo, Philip C. Cifarelli and Thomas A. Cifarelli, and seven grandchildren Candace, Amanda, Jeanine, Alex, Vincent, Angela and Michael.  He is also survived by his younger brother Dr. Albert V. Cifarelli of New York City, and his second wife Barbara.

References

1935 births
2008 deaths
20th-century American lawyers
American gastroenterologists
Deaths from lung cancer
Georgetown University School of Medicine alumni
Long Island University alumni